Marcos Antonio Milinkovic (born December 22, 1971 in Villa Ballester, Buenos Aires) is an Argentine volleyball player. Milinković is 203 cm tall and weighs 100 kg.

Milinkovic started playing the sport at age 17, a relatively late age. Milinkovic is of Croatian descent.

Milinkovic was granted the Platinum Konex Award in 2010 as the best Volleyball player of the last decade in Argentina. He speaks Spanish, Portuguese, and Italian.

Clubs
  Sportivo Ballester (1988–1990)
  Obras Sanitarias de Buenos Aires (1990–1992)
  Tomei Livorno (1992–1993)
  Uliveto Tomei Livorno (1993–1994)
  Cocamar Paranà (1995–1996)
  Chapecoense Santa Catarina (1996–1997)
  Olimpikus Rio de Janeiro (1997–1999)
  Sisley Treviso (1999–2000)
  Asystel Milano (2000–2003)
  Unisul Florianopolis (2003–2004)
  Olympiacos S.C. (2004–2005)
  Cimed Florianopolis (2006–2007)
  Unión de formosa (2008–2010)
  Buenos Aires Unidos (2011-)
 C.D Voleibol San Pedro(2020-2021)

Awards

National Team

Individuals
 2000 Summer Olympics "Best Scorer"
 2002 FIVB World Championship "Most Valuable Player" 2002 FIVB World Championship "Best Scorer"''

Team
 1995 Pan American Games,  Gold Medal

Clubs

Individuals
 2005 Top Teams Cup – MVP

Team
 1999–00 CEV Champions League –   Champion, with Sisley Treviso
 2000 Coppa Italia –  Champion, with Livorno
 2005 CEV Top Teams Cup –  Champion, with Olympiacos

References

External links
 FIVB 2007 Profile
 Milinkovic Profile at ESPN 
 Italian League Profile
 Interview in volley country

1971 births
Living people
People from San Martín, Buenos Aires
Argentine men's volleyball players
Argentine people of Croatian descent
Olympiacos S.C. players
Volleyball players at the 1996 Summer Olympics
Volleyball players at the 2000 Summer Olympics
Volleyball players at the 2004 Summer Olympics
Olympic volleyball players of Argentina
Volleyball players at the 2007 Pan American Games
Pan American Games competitors for Argentina
Wing spikers
Sportspeople from Buenos Aires Province
Pan American Games medalists in volleyball
Pan American Games bronze medalists for Argentina
Pan American Games gold medalists for Argentina
Medalists at the 1991 Pan American Games
Medalists at the 1995 Pan American Games